, literally "child's dream", is a Japanese racing car constructor involved mainly in open-wheel and sports car racing.

History

In 1965, Minoru Hayashi built his first racing car, a rebodied Honda S600 coupe. Belonging to Tojiro Ukiya, it was called the "Karasu" (crow in Japanese), due to its shape. Built on a small budget and in a short time, the Karasu emphasized weight reduction and aerodynamics using FRP materials. The car went on to win its debut race at the Suzuka Clubman Race, despite Hayashi having no experience in racecar construction. In 1966 he went on to build the "Macransa", a more extensively modified Honda S800, to compete at the Japanese Grand Prix. This was followed by the "Kusabi" three years later, which was a Formula Junior racing car, and the "Panic" in 1971.

In 1975 at Takaragaike, Kyoto, Hayashi formed Dome with the intention to manufacture cars with small production runs, using racing machines to develop the technology. Three years after the company's formation in 1978, the company produced its first concept car designed for road use, the Nissan L28-powered . It made its public debut at the Geneva Motor Show the same year. For the following year, Dome produced a production version of the Zero called the Zero P2, which was exhibited at the Chicago Auto Show and Los Angeles Auto Expo. The car was refused type approval by the Japanese government, however, and was unable to go into production.

Dome continued as a sportscar constructor building cars for Toyota's motorsport department TOM'S to compete in the All Japan Super Silhouette Championship, then later used Group C cars at the All Japan Sports Prototype Championship, which were also used to compete in the World Sportscar Championship until the end of the decade when Dome switched to building cars for Honda.

Formula Three 
Minoru Hayashi would also assist his cousin Masakazu Hayashi (of the Hayashi aluminum wheel company) establish his own formula car manufacturing concern. After producing cars for Japan's Formula Junior 1600 category for 10 years, their first Formula 3 car was the Hayashi 803 Formula Three car, designed by the two cousins. It was followed by the Hayashi 320 in 1981 designed by Masao Ono, who had also designed the 1976 Kojima F1 car. Osamu Nakako won the All-Japan Formula Three Championship title driving a Hayashi 320. A 320 was also modified for the Formula Atlantic category and won the Macau Grand Prix driven by American Bob Earl. A further development, the 321, saw action briefly in Japan and England. Ono then switched to Dome to work on the sportscar designs, and Hayashi Racing switched to Ralt chassis to win the Japanese F3 title with Kengo Nakamoto.

In 1984, the follow-up Hayashi 322 was a success and helped Shuji Hyodo to win that year's Japanese F3 championship. In 1985, the Hayashi 330 won a single Japanese F3 race, but finishes were good enough to place driver Shuji Hyodo third in season-end standing. A development of the 322, the 331, appeared in a handful of Japanese F3 races in 1986 without success and disappeared quietly. A downturn in the aluminum wheel business is credited in causing Hayashi to abandon racing.

Post-Formula Three 
In 1988, Dome would return to production car design, establishing a design studio called Jiotto Design to design cars with its own quarter-scale wind tunnel. The studio produced the Jiotto Caspita supercar, which never went into production due to the recession.

Dome continued to compete with Jan Lammers, Keiji Matsumoto, Ross Cheever and Thomas Danielsson, driving until 1992, when Marco Apicella was signed to drive the new Dome-Mugen F103, taking the title in 1994. The Formula 3000 program continued until 1998 with Shinji Nakano, Katsumi Yamamoto and Juichi Wakisaka but without much success.

Formula One

Late in 1995, Tadashi Sasaki, joined Dome and that autumn the company announced its plan to enter F1 with a car designed by Akiyoshi Uko called the Dome F105, using a Minardi transmission and hydraulic system. Marco Apicella was installed as test driver in 1996 and the test driving duties were later taken over by Shinji Nakano and Naoki Hattori. The planned 1997 World Championship effort came to nothing and the follow-up car, the Dome F106, never materialised due to lack of sponsorship and Mugen's refusal to supply engines. The Concorde Agreement also delayed the start for the team. By 1999, all development work would fold after Honda's involvement with British American Racing.

Recent projects

In 1999 Dome established Dome Cars Ltd. in the United Kingdom and the Dome Tunnel in Maihara, Shiga Prefecture, which was originally intended for F1 construction. The company also focused its effort in the Japanese GT Championship, which they had been since 1996 and also competing as a team as well as building the Honda NSX for other factory supported teams. They also worked on the aerodynamics on the JTCC Honda Accord.

In 2001, DOME Carbon Magic was formed in Mishima, Shizuoka Prefecture, specifically for carbon composite development and manufacture. It continued to build and race the Honda NSX in the recently-renamed Super GT series, with Takata as the main sponsor.

Dome also upgraded their Dome S101 Le Mans prototype chassis to meet new regulations for 2007.  The new car has been dubbed the S101.5. These S101s were supplied to Racing for Holland. In 2008, Dome introduced a closed-cockpit prototype called the S102 for the Le Mans Prototype 1 (LMP1) class and entered in the 2008 24 Hours of Le Mans after an absence of 22 years.

In February 2012, Dome announced that it will enter an updated S102 in the 2012 24 Hours of Le Mans.  The updated car, designated the S102.5, will be powered by a 3.4L Judd V8. In a departure for Dome, the team will self-fund race operations, rather than lease their car to a separately funded race team.  Dome allied with Pescarolo for race operations until the latter dissolved, and have instructed its team to focus development on outright speed over one lap, rather than on reliability or endurance pace for a 24-hour race.

In 2014, Dome left Super GT as a team entrant to focus on the construction of the Mother Chassis platform for the GT300 class; the team was reported to return in 2017, but did not materialize in favor of entering a Honda Civic TCR in the Super Taikyu Series.

References

External links

Dome official website 
Dome official website 
8W feature on DOME F1 project
GrandPrix.com profile
2006 Super GT profile
2012 LeMans Announcement

Formula One constructors
Car manufacturers of Japan
Japanese racecar constructors
Japanese auto racing teams
24 Hours of Le Mans teams
World Sportscar Championship teams
Formula Nippon teams
Japanese Formula 3 Championship teams
Super GT teams
BMW in motorsport